Triadelphia Reservoir is located on the Patuxent River, in Howard County and Montgomery County, Maryland near the town of Brookeville.

The reservoir was created in 1943 by the construction of the Brighton Dam on the Patuxent.

Triadelphia
The river valley was once occupied by prehistoric Native American settlements surveyed in the 1980s when the modern dam was drained for maintenance.

The reservoir is located on a land grant surveyed by Benjamin Gaither in 1725. It was named after the town of Triadelphia which was founded in 1809 by three Quaker brothers-in-law. Isaac Briggs, Thomas Moore, and Revolutionary veteran and silversmith Caleb Bentley built a small town on 276 acres of land with nine houses, sawmill, general store, grist mill, and a mill race. The property was expanded to 515 acres containing the land grant "Benjamin's Lot" and "What's Left". The Triadelphia Cotton Factory (Montgomery Manufacturing Company) managed by Allen Bowie Davis operated 196 spindles from its waterwheel and grew to several dozen buildings by 1850 including Mt. Carmel Methodist Church and a schoolhouse. In 1868 a flood washed away a portion of the city and a second flood destroyed most of the remainder. The Triadelphia Turnpike company operated a toll road from Triadelphia, to Glenelg to the Baltimore-Frederick Turnpike, now labeled Triadelphia road. By 1905 the town was mostly abandoned. The Ligon family purchased the land, using it for storage and tenants until it went underwater with the construction of the reservoir.

Reservoir

The reservoir holds approximately 6.3 billion gallons of drinking water source and is managed by the Washington Suburban Sanitary Commission (WSSC).

Brighton Dam 
The dam was put into operation in 1944. In 2017, the WSSC began a renovation project in order to rehabilitate the 13 tainter gates and the dam's concrete spillway surface, and the original intake gates and bar screen.  The project began in June 2017, and was completed in December 2019.

Recreation 
WSSC provides recreational facilities to the public on portions of the Triadelphia property, including hiking, picnicking, fishing, boating, horseback riding, and hunting. Permits are required for any boating, and only self-powered or battery powered vessels are allowed. This is enforced by law enforcement who actively patrol the area.

See also
Rocky Gorge Reservoir

References

 FindLakes.com. "Tridelphia Lake, northcentral Maryland." Accessed 2010-11-21.

External links
Patuxent River Profile - Montgomery County Department of Environmental Protection
Washington Suburban Sanitary Commission

Chesapeake Bay watershed
Reservoirs in Maryland
Lakes of Howard County, Maryland
Tourist attractions in Montgomery County, Maryland